The 2005 Perth 400 was a motor race for V8 Supercars held on the weekend of 6 - 8 May 2005. The event was held at the Barbagallo Raceway in Perth, Western Australia, and consisted of three races culminating in 400 kilometers. It was the third round of thirteen in the 2005 V8 Supercar Championship Series.

Results

Qualifying

Results from the qualifying are as follows:

Top Ten Shootout 

Results from the top-ten shootout are as follows:

Race 1

Race 2

Race 3

References

Perth V8 400
Perth V8 400
Sport in Perth, Western Australia
Motorsport in Western Australia